The Worker-communist Party of Kurdistan (Kurdish: , translit. Hizbi Komonisti Krekari Kurdistan) is a Marxist political party in Iraqi Kurdistan. The party was established in March 2008 when the Kurdistan branch of the Worker-communist Party of Iraq was formed into a separate party. It is currently led by Osman Hajy Marouf.

The party's main office is in the Suleymaniyah city. The party is also very active among Iraqi Kurdish exiles; its head of abroad committee is based in the UK. It also has branches in Australia, Canada, Finland, Sweden, Norway, Denmark, Netherlands, Germany, Italy and Turkey.

WPK produce a newspaper twice a month, called October. It also has a radio station, called Radio Peshang.

It is a sister party of the Worker-communist Party of Iraq and previously WPK had a good relations with Worker-communist Party of Iran – Hekmatist.

Kurdish spring 2011
The party had a leading role in the 2011 protests in the Suleymaniyah city. Nawzad Baban, member of politburo, was one of the leaders of the protests. He was kidnapped by ruling government with some other party members and released after several days.

Shortly after the protests Worker-communist Party of Kurdistan was officially recognized by Kurdistan Regional Government. But party have rejected several times to get any budget from the government.

See also
Worker-communist Party of Iraq
Worker-communist Party of Iran
Worker-communist Party of Iran – Hekmatist
Mansoor Hekmat

References
Worker-communist Party of Kurdistan | Official Website
  Founding Declaration of the WPK

References

2008 establishments in Iraq
Communist parties in Iraq
Kurdish political parties in Iraq
Political parties established in 2008
Political parties in Kurdistan Region
Worker-communist parties